Richard Emanuel Quinn, Jr. (born September 6, 1986) is a former American football tight end in the National Football League (NFL). He was drafted by the Denver Broncos in the second round of the 2009 NFL Draft. He played college football at the University of North Carolina.

Professional career

Denver Broncos
Quinn was drafted by the Denver Broncos in the second round (64th overall) of the 2009 NFL Draft.  On July 23, 2009, Quinn signed a four-year contract with injury protection guarantee. His first reception was in week 15 of the 2010 NFL season from rookie quarterback Tim Tebow in a 39-23 loss against the Oakland Raiders. Quinn was waived/injured on August 22, 2011, and after clearing waivers, was placed on injured reserve on August 23. He was released with an injury settlement on August 26. He ended his Bronco career with 1 reception for 9 yards.

Washington Redskins
On December 13, 2011, Richard Quinn was signed to the Washington Redskins' 53-man active roster.
Quinn played only one game with the Redskins in Week 15 against the New York Giants of the 2011 season.

He was released by the Redskins on August 31, 2012 for final cuts before the start of the 2012 season.

Cincinnati Bengals
On September 4, 2012, Quinn signed with the Cincinnati Bengals. On March 23, 2013, Quinn was re-signed by the Cincinnati Bengals. On August 25, 2013, he was released by the Bengals.

Arizona Cardinals
Quinn signed with the Arizona Cardinals in August 2013 and was released on August 30, 2013.

Washington Redskins
Quinn signed a reserve/future contract with the Washington Redskins on December 31, 2013. He was released on March 4, 2014.

New Orleans Saints
Quinn was signed by the New Orleans Saints in August 2014 but retired only 6 days after his signing on August 11, 2014.

References

External links
 
 North Carolina Tar Heels bio

1986 births
Living people
American football tight ends
North Carolina Tar Heels football players
Sportspeople from Cuyahoga County, Ohio
Denver Broncos players
Washington Redskins players
Cincinnati Bengals players
Arizona Cardinals players
New Orleans Saints players